The Archdeacon of Aghadoe was a senior ecclesiastical officer within the Anglican Diocese of Limerick, Ardfert and Aghadoe from the mid thirteenth century to the early 20th.  As such he was responsible for the disciplinary supervision of the clergy  within his part of the Diocese of Ardfert (until 1666); and then the combined diocese of Limerick, Ardfert and Aghadoe.

The archdeaconry can trace its history back to Dionysius (Archdeacon of Aghadoe) who held the office in 1266. Two incumbents  went on to hold other high offices:James Bland who became Dean of Ardfert and Alexander Arbuthnot who went on to be Dean of Cloyne then Bishop of Killaloe and Kilfenora. The last discrete incumbent was John George Fahy.

References

Archdeacons of Aghadoe
Lists of Anglican archdeacons in Ireland
 
Limerick, Ardfert and Aghadoe